Dinner at Eight is a 1933 American pre-Code comedy-drama film directed by George Cukor from a screenplay by Frances Marion and Herman J. Mankiewicz, based on George S. Kaufman and Edna Ferber's 1932 play of the same title. The film features an ensemble cast of Marie Dressler, John Barrymore, Wallace Beery, Jean Harlow, Lionel Barrymore, Lee Tracy, Edmund Lowe, and Billie Burke.

Dinner at Eight continues to be acclaimed by critics; review aggregator Rotten Tomatoes reports an approval rating of 90% based on 21 reviews.

Plot
New York City society matron Millicent Jordan is overjoyed when she receives word that Lord and Lady Ferncliffe, the richest couple in England, have accepted her invitation to her upcoming dinner party. However, her husband Oliver, a shipping magnate, finds Lord Ferncliffe a bore. Their daughter, Paula, is preoccupied with the impending return of her fiancé, Ernest DeGraff, from Europe.

Oliver asks Millicent to invite legendary stage actress Carlotta Vance, who has just arrived from Europe. A former lover of Oliver's, Carlotta confesses to him that she is nearly penniless and is interested in selling her stock in the Jordan Shipping Line, but he lacks the funds, as his business has been severely affected by the Great Depression.

Nouveau riche magnate Dan Packard, a former miner, agrees to consider helping Oliver, but later brags to his young, gold-digger wife, Kitty, that he plans to take over the Jordan Shipping Line through crooked stock purchases. Oliver convinces Millicent to invite the Packards. While Kitty eagerly accepts the invitation, Dan refuses to go, but changes his mind when he learns that Lord Ferncliffe will be in attendance.

On the morning of her dinner, Millicent loses the "extra man" she found for Carlotta. She telephones Larry Renault, a washed-up silent film star, and extends a last-minute invitation, unaware that Paula is in his hotel room. Larry and Paula have been having an affair for a month, but he wants to end it, citing their age difference (he is 47 and she is 19) and the fact that he is a three-time divorcé. Paula insists that she loves him, planning to tell her family and Ernest about their affair. Carlotta, who is staying in the same hotel, sees Paula leave Larry's room.

Larry, a hardened alcoholic, is on the brink of physical and economic collapse. His agent, Max Kane, tells him that the stage play he was set to star in has a new producer, Jo Stengel. Stengel decided to cast another actor in the lead role, but is willing to consider Larry in a bit part.

The Jordans' physician and friend Dr. Wayne Talbot has been having an affair with Kitty on the pretext of tending to her feigned illnesses. On the day of the dinner, his wife, Lucy, catches him in a compromising telephone call with Kitty. Talbot admits that he is a serial adulterer and vows to overcome his impulses. Lucy is surprisingly understanding, and the two kiss. Talbot receives a visit from an ailing Oliver, who is diagnosed with terminal thrombosis of the coronary arteries. At home, Oliver tries to tell Millicent that he needs to rest, but she is too hysterical to pay attention to him because, among several domestic disasters, the Ferncliffes have canceled.

During a vicious fight, Kitty spitefully reveals to Dan that she is having an affair. When threatened with divorce, she demands that he back down from his takeover of the Jordan Line and treat her with more respect, or else she will sabotage his potential Cabinet appointment by exposing his crooked deals. Defeated, Dan storms off.

Before he leaves for the dinner, Larry is visited by Max and Stengel. Upon discovering that the role being offered to him is that of a dead man, Larry drunkenly insults Stengel, who leaves in haste. Frustrated, Max forces Larry to face reality by bluntly asserting that he has no future in show business, before leaving. To make matters worse, the hotel manager tells Larry he has until the next day to leave. Larry, in utter despair, commits suicide by turning on his gas fireplace.

The dinner guests arrive at the Jordans' mansion. Carlotta informs Paula that Larry has killed himself, consoling the young woman as she breaks down in tears. Millicent learns about Oliver's health and financial setbacks. Realizing her own selfishness, Millicent tells Oliver that she is willing to adopt a more frugal lifestyle. As the guests are about to go in to dinner, Kitty pressures Dan to tell Oliver that he has saved the Jordan Line.

Cast

 Marie Dressler as  Carlotta Vance
 John Barrymore as Larry Renault
 Wallace Beery as Dan Packard
 Jean Harlow as Kitty Packard, Dan's wife
 Lionel Barrymore as Oliver Jordan
 Billie Burke as Millicent Jordan, Oliver's wife
 Lee Tracy as Max Kane, Larry Renault's agent
 Edmund Lowe as Dr. Wayne Talbot
 Madge Evans as Paula Jordan, the Jordans' daughter
 Jean Hersholt as Jo Stengel, a theatrical producer
 Karen Morley as Lucy Talbot, Wayne Talbot's wife
 Louise Closser Hale, as Hattie Loomis, Millie's cousin 
 Phillips Holmes as Ernest DeGraff, Paula Jordan's fiancé
 May Robson as Mrs. Wendel, the Jordans' cook
The cast also includes

 Grant Mitchell, as Ed Loomis, Hattie's husband
 Phoebe Foster as Miss Alden
 Elizabeth Patterson as Miss Copeland
 Hilda Vaughn as Tina, Kitty's maid
 Harry Beresford as Fosdick
 Edwin Maxwell as Mr. Fitch, hotel manager
 John Davidson as Mr. Hatfield
 Edward Woods as Eddie
 Anna Duncan as Dora
 Herman Bing as the waiter

Production
TCM.com says that the character of Carlotta was inspired by the popular stage and silent film actress Maxine Elliott, citing the March 13, 1940, obituary in The New York Times.

Marie Dressler died of cancer in July 1934, less than a year after Dinner at Eight was released. She was recovering from surgery when Dinner at Eight began filming.

Joan Crawford was considered for the part of Paula Jordan. Clark Gable was considered for the part of Dr. Wayne Talbot.

The name of Carlotta Vance's dog, Tarzan, was changed from Mussolini by MGM executives afraid of offending the Italian leader.

According to Director George Cukor, John Barrymore created the character Larry Renault using memories of his father-in-law, Maurice Costello, his brother-in-law, Lowell Sherman, and himself.

Reception
Dinner at Eight proved to be popular at the box office. According to MGM records the film earned $1,398,000 in the US and Canada and $758,000 elsewhere, resulting in a profit of $998,000.

In 1933, Dinner at Eight received very high marks from many leading reviewers. Mordaunt Hall, the widely read critic for The New York Times, admired the screenplay's thoughtful but "fast-moving" blend of drama and "flip dialogue", crediting the skillful adaptation of George S. Kaufman and Edna Ferber's script from the stage production, which had opened on Broadway the previous year. Hall also praised the performances of the film's star-studded cast, drawing special attention to the work of Marie Dressler, Billie Burke, John Barrymore, Wallace Beery, and Jean Harlow:

In its review, Variety also praised the film's storyline and performances. It highlighted Dressler's role as well, although the influential entertainment trade weekly focused its compliments chiefly on Harlow's portrayal of Kitty:

Awards and honors
Dinner at Eight was voted one of the ten best pictures of 1934 by Film Daily'''s annual poll of critics.

In 2000, American Film Institute included the film in the list AFI's 100 Years...100 Laughs at number 85.

Come to Dinner parodyCome to Dinner, 22 minutes in length, is a 1934 Broadway Brevity parody of Dinner at Eight using look-alike actors. It is included in the 2005 Warner Video DVD release of Dinner at Eight.

1989 remake
A television film remake starring Lauren Bacall, Charles Durning, Ellen Greene, Harry Hamlin, John Mahoney and Marsha Mason was broadcast on TNT Channel on December 11, 1989. It was directed by Ron Lagomarsino.

 Frasier homage 
The movie is pastiched in the third episode of the sitcom Frasier, using the same title for its episode. Interestingly, John Mahoney (who was in the TV remake) also features in the episode.

References

External links

 
 
 
 
 Dinner at Eight on The Campbell Playhouse'': February 18, 1940
 Cukor and main cast after wrap enjoy Coca Cola – minus Wallace Beery and John Barrymore

1933 films
1933 comedy-drama films
1933 romantic comedy films
1933 romantic drama films
1930s romantic comedy-drama films
Adultery in films
American black-and-white films
American films based on plays
American romantic comedy-drama films
Films about the upper class
Films based on works by Edna Ferber
Films directed by George Cukor
Films produced by David O. Selznick
Films set in New York City
Films with screenplays by Frances Marion
Films with screenplays by Herman J. Mankiewicz
Great Depression films
Metro-Goldwyn-Mayer films
1930s English-language films
1930s American films